The 89th Medical Group was a United States Air Force medical group. It was based in Andrews Air Force Base before it merged with the 11th Medical Group to form the 79th Medical Wing. The merger occurred on  May 12, 2007. Prior to the merger it was commanded by Brigadier General Thomas W. Travis. It was based at a 70-bed tertiary care center located in the Andrews Air Force Base. It included physiological training including altitude chamber training.

References

Groups of the United States Air Force
Medical units and formations of the United States Air Force
Military units and formations established in 1958
Military units and formations disestablished in 2007